AiRail Service is offered by Deutsche Bahn AG in cooperation with Lufthansa, American Airlines and Emirates. It is one example of several a dedicated air-rail alliances currently operating worldwide.

AiRail Service is currently offered between Frankfurt (Main) Flughafen Fernbahnhof (the long-distance railway station of Frankfurt International Airport) and the central railway stations of Cologne, Dusseldorf and Stuttgart, among others.

It enables all passengers to check in their baggage at the stations and use the ICE high-speed train service to Frankfurt Airport (first class for passengers with Business and First tickets, second class for passengers with Economy tickets) without having to carry their baggage themselves.

Right after arriving at the long-distance train station at Frankfurt Airport, Lufthansa Express Rail customers can quickly and conveniently drop off their baggage and also check in for their flight in the nearby AiRail Terminal.

AiRail Service uses the Cologne-Frankfurt high-speed rail line (maximum speed of 300 km/h) and between Stuttgart and Mannheim (maximum speed of 250 km/h), rendering the train service faster and more reliable than air transport on the same route.

AiRail Service was established some decades ago, when Deutsche Bundesbahn (now Deutsche Bahn AG) established a direct connection between Düsseldorf and Frankfurt Airport using the DB 403 "Donald Duck" EMU with tilting technology in Lufthansa livery. 
In the 1990s they established the Stuttgart-Frankfurt connection after the high-speed train line between Stuttgart and Mannheim was opened. Both services were closed due to high cost some years later.
In 2000 they re-established the service between Stuttgart and Frankfurt, now using only some seats in regular cars in standard ICE service.

See also 
 Air-rail alliance
 Intermodal passenger transport

References

External links 
Rail&Fly - the train to your plane
High-speed rail in Germany
Transport in Frankfurt
Intercity Express